The 2002 SCCA ProRally Season was the 30th season of the SCCA ProRally and won by Manxman David Higgins, who beat elder brother Mark, and title defender Mark Lovell in a British 1-2-3. Ten rounds were held from January 2002 to October 2002. The co-driver title went to Lovell's co-driver Steve Turvey because David Higgins had Calvin Cooledge, Chris Patterson and Daniel Barritt whilst Mark Higgins had Michael Gibson, Claire Mole and Bryan Thomas and Turvey scored more points.
The manufacturer's title went to Hyundai.

Teams and drivers

Calendar
Sno*Drift Rally won by Frank Sprongl
Cherokee Trails won by David Higgins
Oregon Trail ProRally won by David Higgins
Rim of the World ProRally won by David Higgins
Susquehannock Trail ProRally won by David Higgins
Falken Tire Pikes Peak International Hillclimb won by Mark Lovell
Maine Forest Rally won by Mark Lovell
Ojibwe Forests Rally won by Mark Higgins
Wild West International ProRally won by Rhys Millen
Lake Superior ProRally won by Mark Higgins

Standings

References

External links
 2002 Results at rallyracingnews.com

2002 in motorsport
2002 in rallying